Alappuzha Bypass is a part of NH 66 that bypasses CBD of Alappuzha city in Kerala, India. The 6.8 km long two line bypass is the first and longest elevated beach highway in the country, starting at Kalarcode in the south to Kommady in the north. It runs along the scenic beachside of Alappuzha City. It is a joint venture (50:50) between the central and state governments. The contractor for the project is RDS-CVCC, which is a joint venture. The same joint venture was responsible for Kollam Bypass 2 lane which was inaugurated in 2019 by the Honorble PM Shri Narendra Modi. CVCC executed Kollam Bypass and RDS construction company completed the Alappuzha bypass in 2020.This is the first bypass project in the state of kerala   but the construction is delayed nearly 40 years 

The Central government contributed Rs 185 crores and the State government Rs 250 crores for the project .
 The bypass is under  Thuravoor Thekku - Paravur strech of National highway widening project. As a part of six lining of national highway  a three line elevated bridge parallel to the existing elevated bridge is under construction

History

The necessities and proposals for a bypass at Alappuzha dates back to early 1980s. NH 66 is one of the longest national highways in India stretching from Panvel to Kanyakumari and criss-crosses through Alappuzha city centre. The highway gets more and more narrower as it enters the urban area, and together with the criss-cross transformation, creates no less than a bustle inside the city centre. Since then it had been a long time plea to reroute the national highway around the downtown.

Timeline

Project specifications

Gallery

See also

 Alappuzha
 Alappuzha District
 List of National Highways in India by state
 List of state highways in Kerala
 National highways in India
 Roads in India
 Roads in Kerala

References

NH bypasses in Kerala
66
Roads in Alappuzha district
2021 establishments in Kerala
History of Kerala (1947–present)